The Peace Arch Border Crossing is the common name for the Blaine–Douglas crossing which connects the cities of Blaine, Washington and Surrey, British Columbia on the Canada–United States border. I-5 on the American side joins BC Highway 99 on the Canadian side. Being the most direct route between the major cities of Seattle, Washington and Vancouver, British Columbia, the crossing is the third-busiest on the border with up to 4,800 cars a day. Trucks and other commercial vehicles are prohibited from this location and use the Pacific Highway Border Crossing, which is  eastward.

Canadian side
The river was the only route for vessels serving the area. When the Semiahmoo Trail opened for vehicular traffic, a New Westminster–Blaine stage service was established. The customs office was in the train station.

When the Great Northern Railway relocated its track via White Rock in 1909, the border station moved westward to the present location near the foreshore. The Port of White Rock provided administrative customs oversight. Oversight passed to New Westminster in 1927 and then to the Port of Pacific Highway in 1932. Canada built a large wooden border station in 1929, being replaced by a concrete structure in 1952. Enlargements were made in 1963. The present facility, which opened in 2009, included an increase in the number of lanes from seven to ten.

Peace Arch Park
Between the two border stations sits the Peace Arch Park, where visitors are free to cross the border within the confines of the park. The Peace Arch was erected in 1921 when a hotel and residences occupied much of the later park area. In 2010, the only time the Olympic torch left Canada was in crossing the border into the US side of the park.

US side
The original 1920s-era brick building underwent a major rebuild in 1979. The General Services Administration constructed the new state-of-the-art facility which opened in 2010 but was officially dedicated the next year. Wait times can be up to four hours; traffic lights exist on the southbound lane, with timers showing when the light will turn green so drivers can turn off engines.

See also
 List of Canada–United States border crossings

References

Canada–United States border crossings
Transport in Surrey, British Columbia
Transportation buildings and structures in Whatcom County, Washington
1891 establishments in British Columbia
1891 establishments in Washington (state)
Interstate 5